Alçılı is a village in the Pazar District, Rize Province, in Black Sea Region of Turkey. Its population is 368 (2021).

History 
According to list of villages in Laz language book (2009), name of the village is Xanch'kuni. Most villagers are ethnically Laz.

Geography
It is surrounded by Aktepe, Aktaş, Dağdibi and Yavuzköy villages.

References

Villages in Pazar District, Rize
Laz settlements in Turkey